The Dungeons & Dragons Computer Fantasy Game is a handheld electronic game released by Mattel in 1981.

Mattel Electronics' handheld Dungeons & Dragons were inspired by a fledgling adventure text game from the 1970s. Designer Peter Oliphant claims that it was one of the more basic projects he worked on during his career.

Dungeons & Dragons
Dungeons & Dragons (also known as D&D) is a role-playing game first established in 1974 by Gary Gygax and Dave Arneson. D&D is essentially a mental game; no boards or player pieces are used; instead, a set of odd-shaped dice and a rule book is used. Individuals would play the role of a character that they choose in a fantasy world where magic is real, and heroes would embark on a perilous mission for fame and money. Characters would then gain experience by defeating dangers and reclaiming their wealth. All of this information could be found in the preface of the rule books that players must read before they start their game.

Dungeons & Dragons was a huge hit when it first came out, and people are still playing it today. They would build campaigns and modernize them to better fit the scenario. One of the causes for its increasing popularity over time, particularly the growth of participants in 2016, was Netflix's hit TV show Stranger Things. Many kids would try out the game after seeing it, and adults would relive their golden days playing it. Those who participate in a game of Dungeons & Dragons - of which now there are over 3 million people worldwide - quickly learn that the game closely resembles real life with the addition of a fairytale.

Gygax, who created the original Dungeons & Dragons rules, has spent most of his life playing games. He loved playing with nickel and dime lead soldiers, reading fantasy and science fiction books, and creating this game was a way for him to help kids alike find their inner creativity.

Typically, the game is played inside, with the players seated around a tabletop. A typical Dungeons & Dragons game consists of an "adventure" or "campaign setting" in a fantasy world; this is why it is commonly referred to as a campaign rather than a game. Each player controls only one character. Based on the rules and the Dungeon Master's interpretation of those rules, the Dungeon Master would then determine the outcomes of the characters' choices and the overarching storyline for the game. Depending on what the Game Master has prepared, these campaigns could span anywhere from hours to days.

The first edition, published in January 1974, was titled Dungeons & Dragons and is now regarded as the original Dungeons & Dragons. It consists of a box set with three books, Men & Magic, Monsters & Treasure, and The Underworld & Wilderness Adventures, as well as five supplements, Greyhawk, Blackmoor, Eldritch Wizardry, Gods, Demi-Gods, & Heroes, and Swords & Spells, all based on Chainmail fantasy rules.

Release
The Dungeons & Dragons Computer Fantasy Game was released in the fall of 1981. Mattel stated that the game immediately sold out, setting it apart from some of Mattel Electronics' more well-known sports-themed handhelds.

Display
The game unit is a portable game with an LCD screen, and is powered by watch batteries.

The game opens with an isometric view of a simple 3D dungeon. The player is represented by a minor character who appears to be holding a sword aloft. The protagonist is at a crossroads in four passageways. The character's placement is indicated by an expanded letter and number, which always starts at A0. A cursor button moves a black arrow in one of four directions, while a move button moves the surface in the same way.

The character that the player would be controlling and the maze are depicted in the bottom left corner of the tiny screen, giving room for other icons that indicate when other items and monsters are nearby in one of the four directions. This contains a bat that can randomly pick the character up and place the character elsewhere in the maze. There is also a pit that will kill the character if the character does not have a rope to pull the character out of the pot. The rope occurs at the beginning of the game's most accessible setting, in the dungeon in the intermediate location, and there is no rope in the most challenging environment.

Gameplay

The LCD screen displayed a dungeon junction in quasi-three dimensions, coupled with hints of routes that the player may explore further. Each intersection also featured a number and letter designation, allowing the player to create a map while searching. The dungeon itself was made up of 100 squares laid out in ten rows ten. However, because the dungeon circled around itself, if the player were to walk beyond the edge in any direction, the character would resurface at the other edge.

The gameplay is similar to Hunt The Wumpus, in that the player moves through a maze, must beware of bats and pits, and must find an arrow and shoot it at the dragon without entering its lair directly. To win, the player must first find the magical arrow, then the dragon, and then shoot it with the weapon while in another room.

Every few seconds, an ominous four-tone piece of music plays as the player navigates through the maze. Each movement is accompanied by a tapping sound that is meant to indicate movement. The player will hear a descending sound followed by a few notes from a death dirge if the character falls into a pit. Unlike Hunt for the Wumpus, D&D's gameplay takes place on a ten by ten grid, with each square representing a different room.

The positioning of the dozen pits, the magical arrow, rope, and dragon are determined at random in each game. When the player wins, the player is given a score based on how long it took to complete the game, with one point provided for every five seconds. With its silly, off-set LCD screen and weird graphic of white-outlined cobblestones, the entire game is approximately the size of an inch-thick or so credit card. According to Oliphant, the game was much easier to code because it was turn-based and followed a set of rules rather than relying on real-time activity.

"I felt the layout was fantastic for a turn-based game," he continued. "The LCD art was fantastic - you could tell right immediately that the monsters were bats and a dragon." As a result, I was pleased with the final product."

While he was working on the prototype, another group was in charge of programming the production version that was presented to the market. He does recall, though, that it was a system with limited memory that made full use of it.

"It wasn't as difficult as some of my past games," he said. "It was definitely one of the easier assignments I've done in terms of my engagement."

Oliphant believes Mattel Electronics sought to venture out from its usual sports games for this handheld in order to get numerous different licenses for new properties in order to widen the type of games they were developing. As a result, licensed games like Battlestar Galactica, Flash Gordon, and Masters of the Universe were developed, as well as non-licensed oddities like Chess, Backgammon, and the Horoscope Computer.

Reception
Electronic Games in 1983 wrote that Dungeons & Dragons "is sure to win your heart". The magazine liked the gameplay and sound effects, and concluded that it "is an exciting and novel approach to the famous fantasy game".

Bats found in the game could transport you to another spot on the map, which could get extremely annoying. There was also a countdown clock that indicated the passage of time. While playing, You have to be quick, alert, and lucky to win. You could accomplish everything perfectly and yet still lose due to uncontrollable forces, which is one of the many reasons that players get frustrated while playing.

Reviews
Jeux & Stratégie #18

See also
Dungeons & Dragons Computer Labyrinth Game, Mattel's previous Dungeons & Dragons game

References

1980s toys
1981 video games
Dungeons & Dragons video games
Handheld electronic games
Mattel video games
Video games developed in the United States